Harold Davies, Baron Davies of Leek, PC (31 July 1904 – 28 October 1985) was a British Labour Party politician.

He was elected at the 1945 general election as Member of Parliament (MP) for Leek in Staffordshire, and held the seat until his defeat at the 1970 general election by the Conservative candidate David Knox.  Davies was subsequently created a life peer on 28 September 1970, as Baron Davies of Leek, of Leek in the County of Stafford.

Parliamentary career
Davies was elected in 1945 for his large north Staffordshire seat that included a northern part of the Newcastle-under-Lyme-Stoke-on-Trent conurbation, partly employed in the increasingly uncompetitive basic clothes textiles manufacturing (see William Bromfield) but also, in the towns themselves, as today, also having major employment in the high quality, niche firms comprising the Staffordshire Potteries.  Amid all the change towards advanced machinery and engineering in the area, he managed to retain the seat during the Third Churchill ministry and its two conservative following ministries led by Eden and Macmillan.

He was always associated with the left of the party and was involved with the "Keep Left" and Bevanites. He was an assiduous local MP but his left wing views led to him being overlooked for Ministerial office during the Attlee governments (1945-51).

He was Parliamentary Secretary to the Ministry of Pensions from 1964 to 1966, and then Parliamentary Secretary to the Minister of Social Security until 1967.  Afterwards, he became Parliamentary Private Secretary to Prime Minister Harold Wilson between 1967 and 1970. He was made a Privy Councillor in 1969.

Vietnam War Talks envoy
Appointed to junior office by Harold Wilson, Davies made headlines when Wilson despatched him on a "secret" mission to Hanoi. This was an attempt to broker talks between the North Vietnamese leader Ho Chi Minh and the Americans and their allies. Wilson's policy of support for the US was generally unpopular, and poorly supported within the Labour Party. But his stated commitment to the "special relationship" with the US, and the need for US economic support, meant that he continued to lend his government's support to the US policy of military involvement in Vietnam.

Davies, left wing and anti-militaristic, lent an air of conviction to putting out peace feelers. But the mission went badly, with its secrecy blown before Davies emerged from his plane in Hanoi. The Americans were furious, UK diplomats embarrassed and angry and Ho Chi Minh refused to meet Davies, who had been made to look foolish.

When in the Commons, Davies led the 40-strong group of members who spoke Esperanto.

References

External links 

1904 births
1985 deaths
Labour Party (UK) MPs for English constituencies
Davies of Leek
Members of the Privy Council of the United Kingdom
Ministers in the Wilson governments, 1964–1970
Parliamentary Private Secretaries to the Prime Minister
UK MPs 1945–1950
UK MPs 1950–1951
UK MPs 1951–1955
UK MPs 1955–1959
UK MPs 1959–1964
UK MPs 1964–1966
UK MPs 1966–1970
UK MPs who were granted peerages
Life peers created by Elizabeth II